Nečín is a municipality and village in Příbram District in the Central Bohemian Region of the Czech Republic. It has about 800 inhabitants.

Administrative parts
The villages of Bělohrad, Jablonce, Lipiny, Skalice, Strupina, Vaječník and Žebrák are administrative parts of Nečín.

References

Villages in Příbram District